Craig D. Idso is the founder, president and current chairman of the board of the Center for the Study of Carbon Dioxide and Global Change,. He is the brother of Keith E. Idso and son of Sherwood B. Idso.

Early life and education 
After growing up in Tempe Arizona, Idso received his B.S. in Geography from Arizona State University, his M.S. in Agronomy from the University of Nebraska - Lincoln in 1996, and his Ph.D. in geography from Arizona State University in 1998. His doctoral thesis was titled, Amplitude and phase changes in the seasonal atmospheric  cycle in the Northern Hemisphere.

Career 
Idso remains actively involved in several  aspects of global and environmental change, including climatology and meteorology, along with their impacts on agriculture.  Idso has published scientific articles on issues related to data quality, the growing season, the seasonal cycle of atmospheric , world food supplies, coral reefs, and urban  concentrations, the latter of which he investigated via a National Science Foundation grant as a faculty researcher in the Office of Climatology at Arizona State University.  His main focus is on the environmental benefits of carbon dioxide. In addition, he has lectured in meteorology at Arizona State University, and in Physical Geography at Mesa Community College and Chandler-Gilbert Community College.

He is the former Director of Environmental Science at Peabody Energy, and a science adviser to the climate change denialist group The Science and Public Policy Institute, which also receives funding from ExxonMobil.

Idso is a lead author of the reports of the Nongovernmental International Panel on Climate Change (NIPCC), a project sponsored by the Heartland Institute. An unauthorized release of documents indicate Idso received $11,600 per month in 2012 from the Heartland Institute.

He is a member of the American Association for the Advancement of Science, American Geophysical Union, American Meteorological Society, Association of American Geographers, Ecological Society of America, and The Honor Society of Phi Kappa Phi.

Selected publications

References

External links 
 Center for the Study of Carbon Dioxide and Global Change
 Nongovernmental International Panel on Climate Change (NIPCC)
 Craig Idso – Global Warming and Ocean Acidification, International Conference on Climate Change, May 21, 2012

Year of birth missing (living people)
Living people
American climatologists
Arizona State University alumni
University of Nebraska alumni
American geographers